The Journal of the National Comprehensive Cancer Network, established in 2003, is a monthly peer-reviewed medical journal of oncology and the official journal of the National Comprehensive Cancer Network (NCCN). It is published by Harborside Press and the editor-in-chief is Margaret Tempero (UCSF Helen Diller Family Comprehensive Cancer Center). It publishes the NCCN Clinical Practice Guidelines in Oncology, updates and review articles elaborating on guideline recommendations, and health services and clinical research papers, as well as correspondence and commentaries.

Abstracting and indexing 
The journal is abstracted and indexed in:
 Current Contents/Clinical Medicine
 MEDLINE
 PubMed
 Science Citation Index Expanded
According to the Journal Citation Reports, the journal has a 2020 impact factor of 11.908.

References

External links 
 

Oncology journals
English-language journals
Publications established in 2003
Monthly journals